The Sarisariñama Forest gecko (Gonatodes superciliaris) is a species of lizard in the Sphaerodactylidae family native to Venezuela.

References

Gonatodes
Reptiles described in 2008